Hud ibn Muhakkam al-Hawwari,   (d. second half of the ninth-century), was an Ibadi Quran exegete from North Africa.

Biography 
Little is known about his life. It is believed that he was a Berber from the Hawwara tribe and that he lived in the region of the Aurès Mountains in modern day Algeria. His father held the office of Qadi under the rule of Aflaḥ ibn ʿAbd al-Wahhāb (823–871), a ruler of the Rustamid Empire (778–909). His commentary on the Quran was first published in four volumes in 1990, based on five Ibadi manuscripts. The editor of this edition, Belhagg Sa'id Sharifi, an Ibadi from Algeria, wrote in the introduction to the work that al-Hawwari did not write his own original commentary, but based his work on a known tafsir in North African, especially in Kairouan, by Yaḥya ibn Sallam al-Basri (d. 815).  Al-Hawwari created an abridged version without citing the original author. In one manuscript, a marginal note states that the work is only attributed to al-Hawwari (muḍaf ila).

The Ibadi historian Ibn Sallam (d. 887) in his Badʾ al-islam wa-shari'aʿ ad-din /بدء الإسلام وشرائع الدين (The Beginning of Islam and the Laws of Religion) dedicated a chapter to fellow Ibadis, including members of the Hawwara tribe, who settled in Kairouan and took part in the city's scholarly life. These contacts may have enabled Ibadis to access the Quran commentary by Yaḥya ibn Sallam al-Baṣri, which was well known in the city.

Al-Hawwari quotes the exegesis of the Quran by Yahya ibn Sallam al-Basri throughout, thus providing access to this work, which is only available in fragments and partial editions.

References

Citations

Sources 

Belhagg Sa'id Sharifi (ed.): Tafsir Kitab Allah al-Aziz of Hud b. Muḥakkam al-Huwwari. (The Exegesis of God's Honorable Book). 4 Volumes. Dar al-Garb al-Islami. Beirut 1990. Vol. 1, P. 5–38 (Editor's Introduction).
Claude Gilliot: Der koranische Kommentar des Ibāḍiten Hūd b. Muḥkim/Muḥakkam (The Quranic Commentary of the Ibadites Hud b. Muḥkim/Muḥakkam). In: ZDMG, Supplemental Volume XI:XXVI (1995), P. 243–249.
The Encyclopaedia of Islam. New Edition. Vol. 3, 7. Leiden: Brill
Fuat Sezgin: Geschichte des arabischen Schrifttums (History of Arabic Writing). Volume 1, P. 41. Brill, Leiden 1967.
Hammadi Sammoud: Un exégète oriental en Ifriqiya: Yaḥyā b. Sallām (An Eastern Exegete in Ifriqiya: Yaḥya b. Sallam). In: Institut des belles lettres arabes (IBLA) 33 (1970–1972), P. 227–242.
 Josef van Ess: Untersuchungen zu einigen ibāḍitischen Handschriften (Studies on some Ibadite manuscripts). In: Zeitschrift der Deutschen Morgenländischen Gesellschaft (ZDMG), 126 (1976), S. 25ff.here: p. 42–43.
 Werner Schwartz: Die Anfänge der Ibaditen in Nordafrika. Der Beitrag einer islamischen Minderheit zur Ausbreitung des Islams (The Beginnings of the Ibadites in North Africa. The Contribution of an Islamic Minority to the Spread of Islam), pp 31-32 and note 5, p. 337.  Bonn 1983 (Studien zum Minderheitenproblem im Islam 8).
 Werner Schwartz and ash-Salih Salim ibn Yaqub. Bibliotecha Islamica.  Vol. 33. Wiesbaden 1986.

External Links 

 An Overview of Ibadi Tafsir
 Available in Arabic on Altafsir

 Ibadi Islam
Berber writers
Berber Muslims
Quranic exegesis scholars